Francis Brennan (23 April 1924 – 5 March 1997) was a Scottish footballer.

Brennan was a tough centre half who moved to Newcastle United from Airdrieonians for £7,500 in 1946. He made his debut for the club against Millwall in August 1946 and appeared on 351 occasions for the Magpies between 1946 and 1956.

Brennan moved into management after his playing retirement, initially with North Shields between 1956 and 1962, then in Singapore and Trinidad. He returned to North Shields in 1967 and helped them to victory in the 1969 FA Amateur Cup. He was appointed manager of Darlington in August 1971 but stayed in the post for only three months before joining South Shields in a coaching role in 1972.

Career statistics

A.  The "Other" column constitutes appearances and goals in the Charity Shield and Coronation Cup.

Managerial statistics

Honours

As a player
Newcastle United
FA Cup winner: 1951, 1952

As a manager
North Shields
FA Amateur Cup winner: 1969

References

External links

Player Profile: Frank Brennan at toon1892.co.uk

1924 births
1997 deaths
Airdrieonians F.C. (1878) players
Darlington F.C. managers
Newcastle United F.C. players
Footballers from North Lanarkshire
Scotland international footballers
Scottish football managers
Scottish footballers
English Football League players
Association football central defenders
Scotland wartime international footballers
FA Cup Final players